Dophoogchen Gewog (Dzongkha: རྡོ་ཕུག་ཅན་) is a gewog (village block) of Samtse District, Bhutan.

References 

Gewogs of Bhutan
Samtse District